Norman Lee Rathje (April 27, 1936 – December 9, 2011) was an American football player and coach.  He served as the head football coach at North Park College—now known as North Park University—from 1967 to 1968.

Playing career
Rathje played college football at the University of Dubuque as a fullback.  He earned all-conference honors while with the program.  While at Dubuque he also participated on the schools wrestling team and on the track & field squad in the shot put and discus throw.  The University honored him by placing him in their "Athletic Hall of Fame" in 1989.

Coaching career
Rathje was the head football coach at the North Park College—now known as North Park University—in Chicago.  He held that position for the 1967 and 1968 seasons.  His coaching record at North Park was 9–9.

While at North Park, he coached his team to a 100+ point game, defeating North Central College by a score of 104–32 on October 12, 1968.

Death
Rathje died of cancer in 2011 at Lincolnshire, Illinois.

Head coaching record

References

External links
 

1936 births
2011 deaths
American football fullbacks
Dubuque Spartans football players
Dubuque Spartans wrestlers
North Park Vikings football coaches
College men's track and field athletes in the United States
Sportspeople from Cedar Rapids, Iowa
Deaths from cancer in Illinois